Ujjwal Maulik is an Indian computer scientist and a professor. He is the former chair of the Department of Computer Science and Engineering at Jadavpur University, Kolkata, West Bengal, India. He also held the position of the principal-in-charge and the head of the Department of Computer Science and Engineering at Kalyani Government Engineering College.

Education

He did his schooling from Nabadwip Bakultala High School, Nabadwip, Nadia and Rahara Ramakrishna Mission VC College, Rahara, 24 Parganas (North) both in West Bengal.  Subsequently, he completed B.Sc. in Physics and B. Tech. in Computer Science from University Of Calcutta, Kolkata, West Bengal, India in 1986 and 1989.  He also received his M. Tech. in Computer Science and Ph.D. in Engineering in 1992 and 1997 at Jadavpur University, Kolkata, West Bengal, India. He did post-doctoral research at the University of New South Wales, Australia in 1999 and the University of Texas, Arlington, U.S. in 2001.

Research and other activities 
As an Alexander von Humboldt Experienced Researcher, he has worked at the German Cancer Research Center and Ruprecht Karl University of Heidelberg, Germany in 2010, 2011, and 2012. He was a senior associate of the International Centre for Theoretical Physics (ICTP), Italy from 2012 to 2018.
He has also worked in Viswa Bharati University, India, Los Alamos National laboratory, USA, University of Maryland at Baltimore County, USA, Heidelberg University, Germany, Tsinghua University, China, Sapienza University of Rome, Italy, University of Padova, Italy, Grenoble Institute of Technology, France, University of Warsaw, Poland, University of Ljubljana, Slovenia.

He is the Fellow of the  West Bengal Academy of Science and Technology, Indian National Academy of Engineering (INAE), National Academy Sciences India (NASI),
the International Association for Pattern Recognition (IAPR), and the Institute of Electrical and Electronics Engineers (IEEE). He is also a Distinguish member of ACM. He is also a Distinguish Speaker of ACM and Distinguish Lecturer of IEEE CIS.

His research interests include data science, machine learning, bioinformatics, and the Internet of things. In these areas he has published twelve books, more than four hundred research papers including top journals like Nature Communications, ACM & IEEE Journals,  mentored several start-ups, filed many patents and already guided twenty two doctoral students. 

He used to play cricket for Cricket Association of Bengal (CAB) and North 24 Parganas District leagues. Also used to play many other games including Football. He was a short story writes for Bengali Magazines like Sandesh and Shuktara. He is extremely passionate to mentor young students and traveling extensively around the world.

Awards and recognition
IEEE CIS Distinguish Speaker, 2022
Fellow, Asia-Pacific Artificial Intelligence Association (AAIA), Singapore, 2022.
Distinguish Member, ACM, 2021
Elected Fellow, National Academy Sciences India (NASI), 2021
Siksharatna Award, Government of West Bengal, 2021
ACM Distinguish Speaker, 2021 
Elected Fellow, Institute of Electrical and Electronics Engineers (IEEE),2020 
Elected Fellow, International Association of Pattern Recognition (FIAPR), USA, 2018  
Elected Fellow, Indian National Academy of Engineering (FNAE),  India, 2014  
Senior Associate, International Centre for Theoretical Physics (ICTP), 2012–2018.
Alexander von Humboldt Fellowship (AvH) for Experience Researchers, Germany, 2010

References

External links
 Prof. Ujjwal Maulik
 Ujjwal Maulik
 Ujjwal Maulik: H-index & Awards - Academic Profile
 ORCID

1965 births
Living people
Academic staff of Jadavpur University
Indian computer scientists
University of Calcutta alumni
Jadavpur University alumni
Fellows of the Indian National Academy of Engineering
Fellow Members of the IEEE
Bengali scientists
Engineers from West Bengal